The 2016–17 Kent State Golden Flashes men's basketball team represented Kent State University during the 2016–17 NCAA Division I men's basketball season. The Golden Flashes, led by sixth year head coach Rob Senderoff, played their home games at the Memorial Athletic and Convocation Center, also known as the MAC Center, as members of the East Division of the Mid-American Conference. Kent State finished the regular season 22–14, 10–8 in MAC play to finish fourth in the MAC East division. As the No. 6 seed in the MAC tournament, the Flashes defeated Central Michigan, Buffalo, Ohio, and Akron to win the tournament for the first time since 2008. As a result, the Flashes received the conference's automatic bid to the NCAA tournament as the No. 14 seed in the South region. In the First Round, they lost to UCLA.

Previous season
The Golden Flashes finished the 2015–16 season 19–13, 10–8 in MAC play to finish in a tie for third place in the East Division. They lost in the first round of the MAC tournament to Bowling Green. Despite having 19 wins, they did not participate in a postseason tournament.

Offseason

Departures

Incoming transfers

2016 recruiting class

2017 recruiting class

Roster

Schedule and results

|-
!colspan=9 style=| Non-conference regular season

|-
!colspan=9 style=| MAC regular season

|-
!colspan=9 style=| MAC tournament

|-
!colspan=9 style=| NCAA tournament

See also
 2016–17 Kent State Golden Flashes women's basketball team

References

Kent State
Kent State Golden Flashes men's basketball seasons
Kent State
Kent State
Kent State